The Glow in the Dark Tour was a world concert tour by Kanye West featuring Rihanna, Lupe Fiasco, N.E.R.D, Santigold and Nas. It began on April 16, 2008 in Seattle, Washington and traveled to Latin America, Asia, Europe, New Zealand, and Australia through to early December. The tour featured some surprise special guest artists, including Gnarls Barkley and Jay-Z. Chris Brown also appeared at some shows to perform his remix of "Umbrella" with Rihanna, and as a dancer for N.E.R.D. For the New Zealand and Australian leg of the tour special guests Nas and New Zealand rapper Scribe replaced Lupe Fiasco and N.E.R.D, as N.E.R.D toured these countries separately. Vanness Wu performed as the opening act on the Asian leg of the tour and performed "Good Life" with West during the show. A book named after the tour, authored by Kanye West with photography by Nabil Elderkin, was published by Rizzoli USA in October 2009. 

The tour grossed $30.8 million from 49 shows and was by the end of 2008 the second-highest-grossing rap tour that Billboard had ever tracked after the Heart of the City Tour. Direction, production, and lighting design was handled by; Es Devlin, Kanye West, Martin Phillips, John McGuire, and Simon Henwood.

Set list 
This set list is representative of the show on April 16, 2008, at KeyArena in Seattle, Washington. It is not representative of all concerts for the duration of the tour 

 "Good Morning"
 "I Wonder"
 "Heard 'Em Say"
 "Through the Wire"
 "Champion"
 "Get Em High"
 "Diamonds from Sierra Leone"
 "Can't Tell Me Nothing"
 "Flashing Lights"
 "Spaceship"
 "All Falls Down"
 "Gold Digger"
 "Good Life"
 "Jesus Walks"
 "Hey Mama" 
 "Don't Stop Believin'"
 "Stronger"
 "Homecoming"
 "Touch the Sky"

Tour dates

Tour controversies

Sacramento/Seattle mix-up
A brief controversy emerged when during his performance in Sacramento, West accidentally referred to the city as Seattle, the latter of which he performed in only two days prior. West quickly admitted his mistake and made an apology to fans on his official blog.

Bonnaroo controversy
West's scheduled time at the Bonnaroo Music Festival was changed from 8:00 pm to 2:45 am to accommodate the light show for the Glow in the Dark Tour. This marked the first ever late night show on the big "What Stage" in Bonnaroo's 7-year history. Pearl Jam ended up playing 50 mins over their allotted time, leaving less time for the setup of West's stage props for the Glow in the Dark Tour. A message on the monitors stated that the show would start at 3:30. When that didn't happen, the crowd grew restless and started chanting "Kanye Sucks". Once West came out on stage at 4:25 am most people quieted down. The delay was reportedly due to complications in the set up of West's elaborate glow in the dark concept concert after the Pearl Jam set. Graffiti was found throughout the festival ranging from "Fuck Kanye" to "Jay-Z Would Have Been on Time". West later wrote an outraged post on his blog, expressing his anger at the crowd's response and at Superfly's mismanagement.

See also
Glow in the Dark (book)

References

External links
LA Times review
Entertainment Weekly review
New York Times review
Perez Hilton review
The Observer review

Kanye West concert tours
2008 concert tours
Rihanna concert tours